Mecyna arroundella is a moth in the family Crambidae. It was described by Schmidt in 1934. It is found in Morocco.

References

Moths described in 1934
Spilomelinae